Tonderan (also Romanized as Tonderān and Tanderān; also known as Tanderūn and Tundarūn) is a village in Var Posht Rural District, in the Central District of Tiran and Karvan County, Isfahan Province, Iran. At the 2006 census, its population was 1,109, in 290 families.

References 

Populated places in Tiran and Karvan County